Events from the year 1697 in Sweden.

Incumbents
 Monarch – Charles XI, succeeded by Charles XII

Events
 In the spring, the disastrous Great Famine comes to an end.  
 5 April - Charles XI of Sweden dies of stomach cancer, and is succeeded by Charles XII of Sweden under the regency of his grandmother, Hedwig Eleonora.  
 7 May - The royal residence in the capital, Tre Kronor (castle), burns down.

Births

 

 
 
 
 
 Helena Arnell, painter (died 1751)

Deaths

 5 April - Charles XI of Sweden, monarch (born 1655) 
 11 September - Agneta Rosenbröijer, noblewoman and businessperson  (born 1620) 
 - Karin Thomasdotter, vogt and länsman (born 1610) 
 - Ebba Maria De la Gardie, singer and poet (born 1657)

References

 
Years of the 17th century in Sweden
Sweden